"Leave It Alone" is a song written by Radney Foster and Bill Lloyd, and recorded by American country music group The Forester Sisters.  It was released in November 1989 as the second single from their Greatest Hits compilation album.  The song reached number 7 on the Billboard Hot Country Singles & Tracks chart.

Chart performance

Year-end charts

References

1990 singles
The Forester Sisters songs
Songs written by Radney Foster
Warner Records singles
Songs written by Bill Lloyd (country musician)
1989 songs